Skylab & Tragtenberg, Vol. 1 is a collaborative album between Brazilian musicians Rogério Skylab and Lívio Tragtenberg. The first installment of a trilogy, it was self-released on April 16, 2016, and is available for digital download/streaming on Deezer, the iTunes Store and Spotify, as well as on Skylab's official website. "Bengala de Cego" was released as a teaser single on Skylab's official YouTube channel on October 17, 2015.

As its title implies, the track "Hino do Fluminense Football Club" is a cover of the anthem of the eponymous soccer team; Skylab is a die-hard fan of it. "Hino Francês" is sung to the tune of the national anthem of France, "La Marseillaise".

Its artwork (as well as of its successors') is a modified version of Frank Zappa's 1985 album Frank Zappa Meets the Mothers of Preventions cover art.

Track listing

Personnel
 Rogério Skylab – vocals, production
 Lívio Tragtenberg – bass clarinet, sax, keyboards, mixing, arrangements
 Alexandre Guichard – classical guitar (tracks 4 and 9)
 Thiago Martins – classical guitar (tracks 2, 7 and 8)
  – classical guitar, vocals (track 12)
 Daniel Nakamura, Daniel Pinton – mastering
 Carlos Mancuso – cover art

References

2016 albums
Collaborative albums
Rogério Skylab albums
Self-released albums
Obscenity controversies in music
Albums free for download by copyright owner